The 2019 Seniors Masters was a senior snooker tournament, that took place on 11 April 2019 at  in Sheffield, England. It was the fourth event on the 2018/2019 World Seniors Tour.

A qualifying tournament took place from 8 to 10 March at the Northern Snooker Center in Leeds. Barry Pinches won 3–1 in the final against Aaron Canavan.

Despite losing in the final of the qualifying tournament the reigning World Seniors Champion Aaron Canavan was assigned a place in the tournament following a withdrawal.

Cliff Thorburn won the 2018 edition, beating Johnathan Bagley 2–1 in the final. However, he lost 0–2 to Stephen Hendry in the first round of this year's edition.

1986 world champion Joe Johnson won the event, beating Barry Pinches 2–1 in the final.

Prize fund
The breakdown of prize money is shown below:
 Winner: £7,500
 Runner-up: £2,500
 Semi-finals: £1,000
 Highest break: £500
 Total: £12,500

Main draw

 All matches played with a 30-second shot clock, with players having two time-outs per match
 *Re-spotted black replaced final frame deciders

Final

References 

World Seniors Tour
2019 in snooker
2019 in English sport
Snooker competitions in England
Sports competitions in Sheffield
Seniors Masters